Transport in Pakistan is extensive and varied, and serves a population of over 212.2 million people. In recent years, new national highways have been built, with the addition of motorways which have improved trade and logistics within the country. Pakistan's rail network owned by Pakistan Railways is also undergoing expansion in recent years. Airports and seaports have been built with the addition of foreign and domestic funding.

History 

The history of transport in modern-day Pakistan dates back to the Indus Valley civilization.

The Grand Trunk Road was a major road commissioned by Sher Shah Suri in the 16th century and used during the Suri and Mughal periods. Trees were planted, and mosques and temples built along the road. Caravanserais were built for travelers to spend the night.

Railways and Airways were developed during the British Raj. The first railways in Pakistan were built from 1885.

Road

Motorways 

The construction of motorways began in the early 1990s, with the idea of building a world-class road network and reducing the load on the heavily used national highways throughout the country. The M-2 was the first motorway completed in 1998, linking the cities of Islamabad and Lahore. In the past 5 years, many new motorways have opened up, including the M-1 and M-4. The M4 is operational and connects the cities of Pindi Bhatian (M-2), Faisalabad and Multan via Gojra, Toba Tek Singh, Jhang, Shorkot, Pir Mahal and Khanewal. In 2019 M-3 became operational, which connects Lahore with Multan through Abdul Hakeem and the existing M4 near Multan. It terminates at the M5, which became operational in 2019. The M-5 lead to the Sukkur District of Sindh. There, the M-6 (which is proposed with construction work to begin soon) will start; the M6 will end at Hyderabad, where it will meet the existing M9 motorway to Karachi. In addition to this, the M-8 in Baluchistan province, the longest motorway of Pakistan, is half under construction, half operational. In central Punjab, the Lahore-Sialkot Motorway (M-11) is under construction and will be operational by next year, and in KPK province, the Hakka-Dera Ismail Khan Motorway (M14) is also under construction. Swat Motorway has been completed and operational up to Chakdarra. Hazara Motorway one more expressway under construction in KPK province.
 Total: 263,775 km
 Paved: 152,033 km (Including 1600 km of Motorway and 300 km of Expressways)
 Unpaved: 105,650 km (2001)
 Vehicles on road: 4.2 million vehicles 250,000 commercial vehicles (2004 estimate)

National Highways 

During the 1990s, Pakistan began an ongoing project to rebuild all national highways throughout the country specifically to important financial, cargo and textile centers. The National Highway Authority or NHA is responsible for the maintenance of all national highways in Pakistan.
 The Makran Coastal Highway follows the coast of Sindh and Balochistan provinces, linking Karachi and Gwadar. Journey time has been reduced to six or seven hours with the construction of the new Coastal Highway. The highway was built as part of an overall plan to improve transport facilities in southern Balochistan.
 The Karakoram Highway is the highest paved international road in the world. It connects China and Pakistan across the Karakoram mountain range, through the Khunjerab Pass.
 The Grand Trunk Road (commonly abbreviated to GT Road) is one of South Asia's oldest and longest major roads. For several centuries, it has linked the eastern and western regions of the South Asia, running from Teknaf in Bangladesh, entering West Bengal, India travelling across to north India, into Peshawar in Pakistan.
 The Silk Road is an extensive interconnected network of trade routes across the Asian continent connecting East, South, and Western Asia with the Mediterranean world, including North Africa and Europe. It passes through the midsection of Pakistan through cities: Peshawar, Taxila and Multan.

Expressways

Provincial Highways 
 Provincial Highways of Azad Kashmir
 Provincial Highways of Balochistan
 Provincial Highways of Gilgit-Baltistan
 Provincial Highways of Khyber Pakhtunkhwa
 Provincial Highways of Punjab
 Provincial Highways of Sindh

Flyovers and Underpasses

Many flyovers and underpasses are located in major urban areas of the country to regulate the flow of traffic. The highest number of flyovers and under passes are located in Karachi, followed by Lahore. Other cities having flyovers and underpasses for the regulation of flow of traffic includes Islamabad-Rawalpindi, Faisalabad, Gujranwala, Multan, Peshawar, Hyderabad, Quetta, Sargodha, Bahawalpur, Sukkur, Larkana, Rahim Yar Khan and Sahiwal etc.

Buses 

Within cities, buses provide a significant role in commuting a large number of travelers from one city to another. Recently, large CNG buses have been put onto the streets of various cities, primarily Karachi and Lahore, and recently Islamabad, as the minivans which were originally used were beginning to cause large traffic problems. Private yellow and white minivans have services throughout cities in Pakistan and get commuters from one point of the city to the other at a low cost. Since 2000, however, the government has taken a comprehensive initiative to modernize the existing bus fleets and minimally impact the environment. This public-private enterprise would gradually introduce 8,000 CNG buses throughout the country and 800 buses in Karachi. This venture will ensure high standards of efficiency and cleanliness.

 Inter city

Bus service in urban areas and between cities is well established with services run by both public and private sectors.

 International
International bus services are also well established in Pakistan and connect to various countries:

 Quetta-Zahidan, Iran
 Quetta-Mashad, Iran
 Gwadar-Zahidan, Iran
 Karachi-Quetta-Zahidan-Tehran, Iran (proposed)
 Peshawar-Jalalabad, Afghanistan
 Peshawar-Kabul, Afghanistan
 Islamabad-Dushanbe, Tajikistan (proposed)
 Islamabad-Kashghar, China (proposed)
 Gilgit-Kashgar see Karakoram Highway
 Lahore-Delhi, India
 Muzaffarabad-Srinagar, India

Taxis 
Another very common form of transport, seen mainly at hotels and airports, are yellow taxis. Drivers charge according to a meter located on the dashboard of the car, but fares can be negotiated if there is no meter. The cab drivers are reliable and will take passengers to any destination required.

There are also numerous privately run services that use cars and minibuses of various types throughout Pakistan, providing a reliable and quick means of transport. Recently, the Radio Cab was introduced in Pakistan, which allows riders to call a toll-free number to get in touch with the closest taxi stand. This service is currently offered in Islamabad, Rawalpindi, Karachi, Peshawar and Lahore. Services for Hyderabad and Faisalabad are now being set up. Another local cab service was introduced in August, 2017 with the name iCAB, claiming to be the first cab service of the country with a centralized platform for all kinds of road transportation services, providing app-based services and getting stupendous response from the people of Pakistan. Launched from the capital territory, iCAB will expand its operations to overall 13 cities of the country.

Cars 
Over the years, the number of cars on Pakistani roads has tripled. Traffic jams are a common scene in major cities across Pakistan. The most popular cars on Pakistani roads are the Suzuki Mehran, Suzuki Cultus, Suzuki Alto, Suzuki Bolan, Daihatsu Coure, Hyundai Santro, Honda Civic, Honda City, Honda Accord, Toyota Corolla, Daihatsu Mira, Nissan Dayz, and Toyota Vitz.

Luxury SUVs and cars are owned by the elite in urban cities and by many large landowners in the villages and rural areas, thus making them a fairly common sight in Pakistan. The most popular models are the Toyota Land Cruiser, Toyota Prado, Land Rover Range Rover, along with several Mercedes-Benzes, BMWs and Audis.

Future cars 
Students and teachers from the National University of Science and Technology developed Pakistan's first ever hybrid gasoline car, the Devrim II, inspired by the Turkish model Devrim. Before that, students from Naval College Karachi and Ghulam Ishaq Khan Institute also made a successful hybrid car, but Devrim II is the most effective one.  The group, the Pak-Wheelers, had succeeded in 2011 in developing a car with a fuel efficiency of 450 kilometres per liter, but were trying to improve it to more than 700 by using hybrid technology.

Auto rickshaws 

Auto rickshaws are a popular method of travelling in cities and are found in almost every city and town in Pakistan. The fare is usually negotiable before commencing a journey; however, due to the level of pollution contributed by auto-rickshaws, the government has recently begun banning older ones and replacing them with CNG auto rickshaws, which tend to be less noisy, form less pollutants and are much bigger and more comfortable. The Punjab government decided in 2005 to replace two-stroke three-wheelers with CNG-fitted four-stroke rickshaws in Lahore, Multan, Faisalabad, Rawalpindi and Gujranwala. Three manufacturers were ordered to produce 60,000 four-stroke vehicles, but they reportedly supplied 2,000 to the government which are now plying on city roads. Similar ordinances are now being considered in other provinces of Pakistan.

A new form of transport in Pakistan is the Qing-Qi (pronounced "ching-chee"), which is a cross between a motorcycle and auto-rickshaw. It runs just like a motorcycle but has three wheels instead of two and can carry a much heavier load. It is an urban transport vehicle and is used mostly for short distances.

Motorcycling and ride-hailing 
Motorcycling is another means of transportation in Pakistan. It is considered to be the most quickest way of getting to areas where vehicles cannot reach. There are also motorcycling operators in the cities. Some of them make use of helmet while others don't. There are also companies such as Bykea that offer ride-hailing services with bikes or motorcycles in Karachi, Lahore, Rawalpindi and others. Ride-hailing services such as Uber and Careem are also available.
In 2019, 2 more private ride-sharing services introduced specifically in the city of Karachi named Airlift and SWVL. Airlift is a Pakistan-based company while SWVL is an Egyptian company.

Metro

Train

The Orange Line Metro Train is an automated rapid transit system in Lahore.  The Orange line is the first of the three proposed rail lines proposed for the Lahore Metro. The line spans  with  elevated and  underground and have a cost of 251.06 billion Rupees ($1.6 billion). The line consists of 26 subway stations and is designed to carry over 250,000 passengers daily.
Karachi Circular Railway is a partially active regional public transit system in Karachi, which serves the Karachi metropolitan area. KCR was fully operational between 1969 and 1999. Since 2001, restoration of the railway and restarting the system had been sought. In November 2020, the KCR partially revived operations.

Bus

Lahore Metrobus is a bus rapid transit service operating in the city of Lahore. The Metrobus network's first phase was opened in February, 2013.
Rawalpindi-Islamabad Metrobus is a  bus rapid transit system operating in the Islamabad Rawalpindi metropolitan area. The Metrobus network's first phase was opened on June 4, 2015, and stretches 22 kilometres between Pak Secretariat, in Islamabad, and Saddar in Rawalpindi. The system uses e-ticketing and an Intelligent Transportation System and is managed by the Punjab Mass Transit Authority.
Multan Metrobus is a bus rapid transit (BRT) system in Multan. Construction on the line began in May 2015, while operations commenced on 24 January 2017.
Peshawar Bus Rapid Transit (Peshawar BRT) is a bus rapid transit system by the Peshawar Development Authority (PDA) in Peshawar, capital of Khyber Pakhtunkhwa province. The construction of the project was started in October 2017 and became operational on 13 August 2020.
Green Line Metrobus is the first phase of Karachi Metrobus that is operational in Karachi. The Government of Pakistan is financing the majority of the project. Construction of the Green Line began on February 26, 2016 and became operational on 25 December 2021.
Faisalabad shuttle train service and Faisalabad Metrobus are the proposed rapid transit projects in the city of Faisalabad. These projects are the part of a mega-project of China–Pakistan Economic Corridor.

Tram
A tramway service was started in 1884 in Karachi but was closed in 1975 because of some reasons. Sindh Government is planning to restart the tramway services in the city by the collaboration of Austrian experts.
In October 2019, a project for the construction of tramway service in Lahore has also been signed by the Punjab Government. This project will be launched under public-private partnership in a joint venture of European and Chinese companies along with the Punjab transport department.

Monorail
The Government of Pakistan is proposing plans to start a Monorail system in the federal capital Islamabad.

Rail

Domestic 
Rail services in Pakistan are provided by the state-run Pakistan Railways, under the supervision of the Ministry of Railways. Pakistan Railways provides an important mode of transportation in Pakistan, catering to the large-scale movement of people and freight. The railway network comprises 8,163 km all of which is  gauge, including 293 km of electrified track. Passenger earnings comprise 50% of the total revenue. During 1999–2000 this amounted to Rs. 4.8 billion. Pakistan Railways carry 65 million passengers annually and daily operate 228 mail, express and passenger trains. Pakistan Railways also operate special trains for various occasions. The Freight Business Unit with 12,000 personnel operates over 200 freight stations on the railway network. The FBU serves the Port of Karachi and Port Qasim as well as in various other stations along the network and generates revenue from the movement of agricultural, industrial and imported products such as wheat, coal, fertiliser, cement and sugar. About 39% of the revenue is generated from the transportation of petroleum, 19% from imported wheat, fertiliser and rock phosphate. The remaining 42% is earned from domestic traffic. The freight rate structure is based on market trends in road transport, which is the main competitor to rail transport.

High speed rail 
Prime Minister Nawaz Sharif said that a high-speed rail network will be built which will connect Peshawar to Karachi via all major cities of Pakistan during his visit to China in June 2016. The Government is making plans for this project.

Rail links with adjacent countries 
 India -
Thar Express to Karachi and the more famous Samjhauta Express international train from Lahore, Pakistan to Amritsar (Attari) and Delhi, India. The weekly Thar Express also runs between Karachi and Bhagat Ki Kothi (near Jodhpur, Rajasthan).

 Iran -
A  railway line runs from Zahedan to Quetta, and a  line is finished from Zahedan to Kerman in central Iran, linking with the rest of the Iranian rail network. On May 18, 2007, a MOU for rail cooperation was signed by Pakistan and Iran under which the line will be completed by December 2008. Now that the rail systems are linked up at Zahedan, there is a break-of-gauge between the Islamic Republic of Iran Railways  tracks and Pakistan Railway's Indian gauge tracks.

 Afghanistan -
Currently there is no rail link to Afghanistan since no railway network is present in that country, however Pakistan Rail has proposed to help build an Afghan Rail Network in three phases. The first phase will stretch from the Chaman to Spin Boldak in Afghanistan. The second phase will extend line to Kandahar and the third phase will eventually connect to Herat. From there, the line will be extended to Khushka, Turkmenistan. The final phase would link  with Central Asian . It is not clear where the break-of-gauge station will be. The proposed line will also be connected the port town of Gwadar via Dalbadin and Taftan, thus connecting the port town to Central Asia.

 China -
There is no link with China however, on 28 February 2007 contracts were awarded for feasibility studies on a proposed line from Havelian via the Khunjerab Pass at 4730 m above sea level, to the Chinese railhead at Kashgar, a distance of about 750 km.

 Turkmenistan -
Via Afghanistan (proposed) – avoiding  intervening.

 Turkey -
An Istanbul-Tehran-Islamabad passenger rail service was proposed recently. Meanwhile, a container train service was launched by the former Prime Minister of Pakistan Yousuf Raza Gilani between Islamabad and Istanbul on 14 August 2009. According to the Minister for Railways Ghulam Ahmad Bilour, after the trial of the container train service, a passenger train will be launched. There are also hopes the route will eventually provide a link to Europe and Central Asia, and carry passengers.

Heritage 
In Ghangha Pur, a  narrow gauge horse-drawn tramway is operational. It was first opened in 1898, closed in 1998, and re-opened in 2010.

Air 

Pakistan has 151 airports. The major airports are:
 Jinnah International Airport (Karachi)
 Allama Iqbal International Airport (Lahore)
 Islamabad International Airport (Islamabad)
 Peshawar International Airport (Peshawar)
 Quetta International Airport (Quetta)
 Skardu International Airport (Skardu)
 Faisalabad International Airport (Faisalabad)
 Multan International Airport (Multan)
 Sialkot International Airport (Sialkot)
 Dera Ghazi Khan International Airport (D.G.Khan)
 Gwadar International Airport (Gwadar)
 Shaikh Zayed International Airport (Rahim Yar Khan)

There are also several smaller airports which have flights to and from the Gulf because of the large Pakistani diaspora working in the region. There are 91 airports with paved runways, of which 14 have runways longer than 3,047 meters. The remaining 48 airports have unpaved runways including one airport with a runway longer than 3,047 meters. Pakistan also has eighteen heliports.

Water

The waterway network in Pakistan is in its infancy, with Karachi being the only major city situated next to the Arabian Sea. Still, plans are being proposed for the development of the waterways in the country along the Indus River and through the Punjab as it would boost employment opportunities and the economic and social development of Pakistan.
 Port of Gwadar – Gwadar, Balochistan
 Port of Karachi – Karachi (City Centre), Sindh
 Karachi International Container Terminal (KICT)
 Pakistan International Container Terminal (PICT)
 Port Qasim – East Karachi, Sindh
 Port of Pasni – Pasni, Balochistan

Ferries 
 Ferry services run between Kimari and Minora Island in Karachi.
 Karachi used to have a ferry connection with City of Mumbai in India until the 1960s, but it was later discontinued when both the countries went into war.
 A cruise service called Gulf Dream Cruise began between Karachi and Dubai in 2006, but it wasn't able to go beyond its first sailing due to visa issues imposed by the UAE authorities.
 In 2020, Pakistan announced its plans to launch a ferry service in near future linking Pakistan through Karachi and Gwadar to Iran, Oman, UAE, and Iraq.

Pipelines 

The above information was calculated in 2009.

China-Pakistan Economic Corridor 
The China-Pakistan Economic Corridor is an under-construction development program to connect Gwadar Port in southern Pakistan to China's northwestern autonomous region of Xinjiang via highways, railways and pipelines to transport oil and gas. Chinese Premier Li Keqiang was among the first advocates of the project; since then General Secretary of the Chinese Communist Party Xi Jinping, former Pakistani President Asif Ali Zardari and Pakistani prime minister Nawaz Sharif have become strong supporters of the project. When the corridor is constructed, it will serve as a primary gateway for trade between China and the Middle East and Africa; in particular, oil from the Middle East could be offloaded at Gwadar, which is located just outside the mouth of the Persian Gulf, and transported to China through the Baluchistan province in Pakistan. Such a link would vastly shorten the 12,000-kilometre route that Mideast oil supplies must now take to reach Chinese ports.

The project received a major boost when control of Gwadar was transferred to China's state-owned China Overseas Ports Holding in February 2013. Built by Chinese workers and opened in 2007, Gwadar is undergoing a major expansion to turn it into a full-fledged, deep-water commercial port. On 19 February 2014, the South China Morning Post reported that Pakistan and China have signed agreements for constructing an international airport at Gwadar, for upgrading a section of the 1,300-kilometre Karakorum Highway connecting to Islamabad, and for a fibre-optic cable to be laid from the Chinese border to the Pakistani city of Rawalpindi.
 According to The Diplomat, with the development of the corridor, Central Asia, traditionally an economically closed region owing to its geography and lack of infrastructure, will have greater access to the sea and to the global trade network. Pak-China Economic Corridor Secretariat was inaugurated in Islamabad on August 27, 2013.

See also 

 Motorways of Pakistan
 National Highways of Pakistan
 Buses in Pakistan
 Customised buses and trucks in Pakistan
 List of bus routes in Lahore
 Road signs in Pakistan
 List of bridges in Pakistan
 Airlines of Pakistan
 Pakistan International Airlines
 Pakistan Civil Aviation Authority
 Port of Karachi
 History of rail transport in Pakistan

References

External links 

 Sindh Transport Department official website
 Karachi Port Trust website
 Daewoo Bus Service
 Pakistan International Airlines website
 Pakistan National Highway Authority website
 Pakistani railways map at the United Nations
 Transport map of Pakistan at Relief Web